David Frost (born April 1, 1965) is a Canadian sprint canoer who competed in the late 1980s and early 1990s. Competing in two Summer Olympics, he earned his best finish of seventh in the C-2 1000 m event at Barcelona in 1992.

References
Sports-Reference.com profile

1965 births
Canadian male canoeists
Canoeists at the 1988 Summer Olympics
Canoeists at the 1992 Summer Olympics
Living people
Olympic canoeists of Canada